Latala  is a village located in the ludhiana west tehsil of Ludhiana District. It is one of the most facilitated villages in the district. It has a dairy plant towards its south established by ex-MLA Jassi Khangura which provides jobs to people of ten nearby villages. Also, the new multipurpose sports stadium is presented in village. The village's school provide good education to students. Also for farmers  there is a grain market in village.

Administration
The village is administrated by a Sarpanch who is an elected representative of the village as per the constitution of India and Panchayati raj (India).

Villages in Ludhiana West Tehsil

Air travel connectivity 
The closest airport to the village is Sahnewal Airport.

References

Villages in Ludhiana West tehsil